The Starfish Country Home School Foundation was registered as a non-profit organization in Thailand in March 2005. The foundation’s principal offices are located outside the Mae Taeng District, about 45 km (27 miles) north of Chiang Mai Province in northern Thailand.

The use of Starfish in the name of the Starfish Country Home School Foundation originates from the famous parable of Loren Eisley, The Star Thrower. That story reflects the philosophy of the Starfish Country Home School Foundation of trying to give significant assistance to a relatively small number of beneficiaries so as to have a large impact on their lives.

The Starfish Country Home School Foundation is not affiliated with any religious or political organization.

Starfish Country Home School (Creativity Center)
In April 2005 the Starfish Country Home School Foundation completed purchase of the site of a former resort on the Ping River and remodeled this for use as a home and free bilingual school for needy hill tribe children. The Starfish Country Home School (Creativity Center) opened in June 2005 with 10 students. It was registered with the Thailand Education Ministry as a kindergarten (anubaan) in 2006 and as a primary school (prathom) in 2008. Teaching is in a combination of English and Thai plus the hill tribe languages.
In May 2016 the Starfish Country Home School had 97 resident children, almost all of whom are either Hmong or Lisu, and 69 Thai day students. The school has two kindergarten classes and six primary school classes. The school uses a curriculum that it calls Thaiglish to teach English. Thaiglish is a picture-based curriculum that uses a combination of Thai and English script to more accurately represent the sound of American English words. The school has also developed its own curriculum for teaching mathematics. Most of the primary school students at the Starfish Country Home School study Western ballet, jazz and Thai classical dancing.

The five grade six graduating at the Starfish Country Home School in Maetaeng have had higher average scores on Thailand’s ONET-6 final examinations than all 120! schools in the city of Chiangmai.

Starfish Homes in Chiangmai and Chiangrai 
In May 2006 the Starfish Country Home School Foundation purchased a new 80-room apartment house in the city of Chiangmai and remodeled it for use as a residence and daycare facility for needy or abused hill tribe children. In May 2016 the Starfish Home had 110 resident children and a free daycare program for 37 additional children aged three to six. 

In May 2014 the Starfish Country Home School Foundation opened the Chiangmai Starfish Learning Center at a site adjacent to the Starfish Home in the city of Chiangmai. In May 2016 that program had 120 preschool students. The Chiangmai Starfish Learning Center uses the same preschool curricula as the Starfish Country Home School in Maetaeng.

In May 2005, the Starfish Country Home School Foundation also started the Wildflower Home, a residential and training program for pregnant girls and single mothers. That program relocated to the Starfish Home Chiangmai in May 2006 and has since become an independent Thai foundation.

In May 2008, the Starfish Country Home School Foundation opened the Starfish Home Chiangrai. The Starfish Country Home School Foundation built a new residence for the Starfish Home Chiangrai that opened in May 2010. In May 2016 there were 31 hill tribe girls living at that site. An Akha woman lawyer in Starfish Home Chiangrai provides free legal aid for hill tribe people.

Most of the resident children at the two Starfish Homes come from broken families with no father and often no mother present. About 20% of the residents have one or both parents in prison.
Starfish Homes are not orphanages and children regularly visit their families whenever possible. Parents are invited to visit the Boarding schools.

Funding External Programs in Asia
The Starfish Country Home School Foundation so far has awarded more than 300 three- or four-year scholarships to needy but talented students in northern Thailand who have finished either grade three or grade six so they can continue to attend a school near their homes.

Since July 2007, the Starfish Country Home School Foundation has funded the complete cost of a program for basic education of inmates at the Chiangmai Women’s Prison. It also supports the costs of a room for babies of inmates within the prison. Additionally, the Starfish Country Home School Foundation provides scholarships for the children of women prisoners.

References

External links
 Starfish Country Home School Foundation's website
 Starfish Country Home School's Channel on YouTube
 Wild Flower Home

Charities based in Thailand
Educational foundations
Educational organizations based in Thailand